Mick Hollis (born 14 November 1949) is an English footballer, who played as a forward in the Football League for Barrow, Chester, Stockport County and Reading.

References

1949 births
Living people
Sportspeople from Loughborough
Footballers from Leicestershire
Association football forwards
English footballers
Leicester City F.C. players
Barrow A.F.C. players
Chester City F.C. players
Stockport County F.C. players
Reading F.C. players
Shepshed Dynamo F.C. players
English Football League players